The 1946 Allan Cup was the Canadian senior ice hockey championship for the 1945–46 season. The Calgary Stampeders, champions of the Western Canada Senior Hockey League, faced off against the Ontario Hockey Association champion Hamilton Tigers.

Final 
Best-of-seven
Calgary 6 Hamilton 2
Calgary 6 Hamilton 1
Calgary 4 Hamilton 3
Hamilton 3 Calgary 1
Calgary 1 Hamilton 0

Calgary Stampeders beat Hamilton Tigers 4-1 on series.

External links
Allan Cup archives 
Allan Cup website

 
Allan Cup
Allan